Hugh O'Brian (born Hugh Charles Krampe; April 19, 1925 – September 5, 2016) was an American actor and humanitarian, best known for his starring roles in the ABC Western television series The Life and Legend of Wyatt Earp (1955–1961) and the NBC action television series Search (1972–1973). His notable films included the adaptation of Agatha Christie's  Ten Little Indians (1965); he also had a notable supporting role in John Wayne's last film, The Shootist (1976).

He created the Hugh O'Brian Youth Leadership Foundation, a nonprofit youth leadership-development program for high-school scholars. It has sponsored more than 500,000 students since O'Brian founded the program in 1958, following an extended visit with physician and theologian Albert Schweitzer.

Life and career

Early life and military service
O'Brian was born Hugh Charles Krampe in Rochester, New York, the son of Hugh John Krampe, who served as an officer in the  United States Marine Corps, and Edith Lillian (née Marks) Krampe. Mr. O’Brian once described his father as “one of the toughest men I ever knew”; this inspired his interest in the military.

O'Brian moved with his parents to Lancaster, Pennsylvania, around 1930, when he was about five years old. His father had become an executive with the Armstrong Cork Company, which was headquartered in Lancaster. The Krampe family lived at the Stevens House Hotel temporarily before moving to the newly developed School Lane Hills houses in the city's West End. O'Brian attended Lancaster city elementary schools. The Krampes resided in Lancaster for about four years before they moved to Chicago, where his father had another position with the Armstrong Cork Company. Years later, in 1963, Hugh O'Brian was awarded the key to the city by Lancaster Mayor George Coe.

After the move to the Chicago area, Krampe and his family lived in Winnetka, Illinois, where he attended New Trier High School. He transferred to the Kemper Military School (now defunct) in Boonville, Missouri, where he lettered in football, basketball, wrestling, and track.

After one semester at the University of Cincinnati, Krampe dropped out to enlist in the Marine Corps during World War II. At 17, he became the youngest Marine drill instructor on record.

Career start and name change
After World War II ended, Krampe planned to become a lawyer and had been accepted at Yale University for the fall of 1947. Before that, he lived in Hollywood, where he was dating an actress. He attended her rehearsals of the Somerset Maugham play Home and Beauty. When the lead actor failed to show up, director Ida Lupino asked him to read the lines. He got the role and the play received a tremendous review, then received a contract offer from an agent.

Krampe changed his name after the program incorrectly listed him as "Hugh Krape". He later said, "I decided right then I didn't want to go through life being known as Huge Krape, so I decided to take my mother's family name, O'Brien, but they misspelled it as 'O'Brian' and I just decided to stay with that."

Lupino signed him to Never Fear, a film she was directing. O'Brian gained a contract with Universal Pictures.

Wyatt Earp and television career
He was chosen to portray legendary lawman Wyatt Earp on the ABC Western series The Life and Legend of Wyatt Earp, which debuted in 1955. To help develop his character, O'Brian bought  Stuart N. Lake's book Wyatt Earp: Frontier Marshal. He also developed a relationship with Lake, who was a consultant on the show for the first two years. The series, alongside Gunsmoke and Cheyenne, which debuted the same year, spearheaded the "adult Western" television genre, with the emphasis on character development rather than moral sermonizing. It soon became one of the top-rated shows on television. During its six-year run, Wyatt Earp consistently placed in the top 10 in the United States. Decades later, he reprised the role in two episodes of the television series Guns of Paradise (1990), the television movie The Gambler Returns: The Luck of the Draw (1991), and the independent film Wyatt Earp: Return to Tombstone (1994), the latter mixing new footage and colorized archival sequences from the original series.

O'Brian appeared regularly on other programs in the 1950s and 1960s, including The Nat King Cole Show, The Jackie Gleason Show, The Ed Sullivan Show, and The Dinah Shore Chevy Show, all in 1957. He was seen in Jack Palance's ABC circus drama The Greatest Show on Earth. He also appeared as a 'guest attorney' in the 1963 Perry Mason episode "The Case of the Two-Faced Turn-a-bout" when its star, Raymond Burr, was sidelined for a spell after minor emergency surgery. He served as guest host on episodes of The Hollywood Palace in 1964 and the rock music series Shindig! in 1965. He was a guest celebrity panelist on the CBS primetime programs Password and What's My Line? and served as a mystery guest on three occasions on the latter series.

In 1971, he filmed a television pilot titled Probe, playing a high-tech (for the times) agent for a company that specialized in recovering valuable items. The pilot spawned a series for O'Brian named Search, which ran one season (1972–1973). In 1999 and 2000, he co-starred with Dick Van Patten, Deborah Winters, Richard Roundtree, and Richard Anderson in the miniseries Y2K - World in Crisis.

Film career

The actor appeared in a number of films, among them Rocketship X-M (1950), The Lawless Breed (1953), There's No Business Like Show Business (1954), White Feather (1955), Come Fly with Me (1963), Love Has Many Faces (1965), In Harm's Way (1965), Ten Little Indians (1965), and Ambush Bay (1966).

While onstage, Elvis Presley introduced O'Brian from the audience at a performance at the Las Vegas Hilton, as captured in the imported live CD release "April Fool's Dinner". O'Brian was a featured actor in the 1977 two-hour premiere of the television series Fantasy Island. He played the last character whom John Wayne ever killed on the screen in Wayne's final movie, The Shootist (1976). O'Brian appeared in fight scenes with a Bruce Lee lookalike in Lee's last – partially completed – film, the controversial Game of Death. O'Brian recreated his Wyatt Earp role for three 1990s projects: Guns of Paradise (1990) and The Gambler Returns: The Luck of the Draw (1991), with fellow actor Gene Barry doing likewise as lawman Bat Masterson for each, as well as the independent film Wyatt Earp: Return to Tombstone (1994). He also had a cameo as the father of Danny DeVito and Arnold Schwarzenegger in the comedy Twins (1988).

Personal life and death

On June 25, 2006, at age 81, O'Brian married his girlfriend of 18 years, Virginia Barber (born circa 1952); it was his first and only marriage. The ceremony was held at Forest Lawn Memorial Park with the Rev. Robert Schuller officiating. Barber, who had been married once previously, is a teacher by profession and the couple spent their honeymoon studying philosophy at Oxford University. O'Brian stated that he believed, "an active mind is as important as an active body." O'Brian had one son, Hugh Donald Krampe, by a relationship with photographer Adina Etkes. O'Brian died at his home in Beverly Hills, California, on September 5, 2016, at the age of 91. Three individuals have since come forward claiming O'Brian was their father.

Hugh O'Brian Youth Leadership Foundation
O'Brian dedicated much of his life to the Hugh O'Brian Youth Leadership Foundation (HOBY), a nonprofit youth leadership-development program for high-school scholars. HOBY sponsors 10,000 high school sophomores annually through its over 70 leadership programs in all 50 states and 20 countries. Since its inception in 1958, over 500,000 young people have participated in HOBY-related programs.

One high-school sophomore from every high school in the United States, referred to as an "ambassador", is welcome to attend a state or regional HOBY seminar. From each of those seminars, students (number based on population) are offered the opportunity to attend the World Leadership Congress. In 2008, over 500 ambassadors attended from all 50 states and 20 countries. The concept for HOBY was inspired in 1958 by a nine-day visit O'Brian had with famed humanitarian Dr. Albert Schweitzer in Africa. Dr. Schweitzer believed, "the most important thing in education is to teach young people to think for themselves."

O'Brian's message was explained in an essay on the topic:

Filmography

Awards
For his contribution to the television industry, Hugh O'Brian has a star on the Hollywood Walk of Fame at  6613½ Hollywood Blvd. In 1992, he was inducted into the Western Performers Hall of Fame at the National Cowboy & Western Heritage Museum in Oklahoma City, Oklahoma.

References

External links

 Hugh O'Brian Youth Leadership Foundation (official website)
 
 
 
 
 
 Hugh O'Brian profile @ Aveleyman.com

1925 births
2016 deaths
20th-century American male actors
American male television actors
American male film actors
American male stage actors
Western (genre) television actors
New Star of the Year (Actor) Golden Globe winners
Male actors from Los Angeles
Male actors from New York (state)
Philanthropists from California
United States Marine Corps non-commissioned officers
United States Marine Corps personnel of World War II
Military personnel from Rochester, New York
California Republicans
University of Cincinnati alumni
New Trier High School alumni
Male actors from Rochester, New York
Actors from Lancaster, Pennsylvania
People from Winnetka, Illinois
American people of English descent
American people of German descent
American people of German-Jewish descent
American people of Scottish descent
Burials at Forest Lawn Memorial Park (Glendale)
Philanthropists from New York (state)
Philanthropists from Illinois
20th-century American philanthropists
Golden Boot Awards recipients